Faris Pemi Moumbagna (born 1 July 2000) is a Cameroonian professional footballer who plays as a forward for Bodø/Glimt.

Club career

Bethlehem Steel FC
Faris spent time with the Florida-based Montverde Academy before signing with United Soccer League side Bethlehem Steel. He joined the club permanently on 16 July 2018. Faris would establish himself as a goalscoring threat for Steel FC during the 2019 season, scoring 11 goals; breaking the team single-season record (10) previously held by Seku Conneh.

After the 2019 season, it was announced that Faris was out of contract and would become a free agent. He made 38 appearances and scored 14 goals for Steel FC.

Kristiansund
In May 2020, Faris signed a three-year contract Kristiansund BK competing in Eliteserien, the highest division of Norwegian football. He made his competitive debut on 21 June, coming on as a late substitute for Sondre Sørli in a 7–2 league victory against Aalesunds FK. His first goal, coincidentally, also came against Aalesund. In a 2–1 away win in the league, Faris headed home a cross from Liridon Kalludra to secure the equaliser, before Kalludra himself scored the winner. Faris made a total of 24 appearances for Kristiansunds BK in the 2020 season; all in the league, as he scored four goals.

SønderjyskE
On 26 August 2021, he joined SønderjyskE on loan. Making his full debut for the club in the third round of the Danish Cup on 23 September, Faris scored his first goal in a 4–3 away win over B 1913. His league debut followed four days later, coming off the bench to replace Emil Kornvig in the 82nd minute of a 1–0 loss to AGF.

References

External links 
 

2000 births
Living people
Cameroonian footballers
Cameroonian expatriate footballers
Association football forwards
Philadelphia Union II players
Montverde Academy alumni
Kristiansund BK players
SønderjyskE Fodbold players
Eliteserien players
USL Championship players
Danish Superliga players
 Cameroonian expatriate sportspeople in the United States
 Cameroonian expatriate sportspeople in Norway
 Cameroonian expatriate sportspeople in Denmark
 Expatriate soccer players in the United States
 Expatriate footballers in Norway
Expatriate men's footballers in Denmark